This is a list of steroidal estrogens or derivatives of estradiol, estrone, and estriol. Most esters of these estrogens are not included in this list; for esters, see here instead.

Estradiol derivatives

17α-Substituted estradiol derivatives

Nitrogen mustard-coupled alkylating antineoplastic estradiol derivatives

17β-Aminoestrogens

Estrone derivatives

Nitrogen mustard-coupled alkylating antineoplastic estrone derivatives

Estriol derivatives

17α-Substituted estriol derivatives

Other estrogen derivatives

Epimers

Equine estrogens

See also
 List of steroids

Notes
? = Chemical names that are unverified.

References

Estrogens
Steroids
Estrogens